José Beyaert (1 October 1925 – 11 June 2005) was a French professional cyclist who competed during the 1940s and 1950s, and was the 1948 Olympics road race champion. Beyaert moved to Colombia in 1952 and lived there for several years where he was the coach to the national cycling team. He also competed in the Vuelta a Colombia which he won on his first attempt in 1952. He finished second the following year and eighth the year after. He also rode in the 1950 Tour de France and finished 47th overall.

Major results 

1945
 3rd Paris–Évreux
1948
 Summer Olympics
1st  Road race
3rd  Team time trial
 3rd Trofeo Matteotti
1949
 1st GP de l'Echo d'Alger
1950
 1st Grand Prix d'Isbergues
 9th Paris–Brussels
1952
 1st  Overall Vuelta a Colombia
1st Stages 2, 3, 6, 11 & 13
1953
 2nd Overall Vuelta a Colombia
1st Stages 3 & 8
1955
 1st Stages 8a, 8b & 17 Vuelta a Colombia

Further reading

References

External links

1925 births
2005 deaths
People from Lens, Pas-de-Calais
French male cyclists
Cyclists at the 1948 Summer Olympics
Olympic cyclists of France
Olympic gold medalists for France
Olympic bronze medalists for France
French cycling coaches
National team coaches
Olympic medalists in cycling
Medalists at the 1948 Summer Olympics
Sportspeople from Pas-de-Calais
Cyclists from Hauts-de-France